Mongolia competed at the 2000 Summer Olympics in Sydney, Australia.

Results by event

Shooting 
Women's 25 m air 
 Otryadyn Gündegmaa

Athletics 
Men's 800 m
 Puntsag-Osor Purevsuren
 Round 1 – 01:56.29 (did not advance)

Women's 5000 m
 Baatarkhuu Battsetseg
 Round 1 – 18:22.98 (did not advance)

Boxing 
Men's 60 kg
 Tumentsetseg Uitumen
 Round 1 – Lost to Almazbek Raimkulov of Kyrgyzstan (did not advance)

Swimming 
Men's 100 m freestyle
 Ganaa Galbadrakh
 Preliminary Heat – 58.79 (did not advance)

Women's 100 m freestyle
 Sanjaajamts Altantuya
 Preliminary Heat – 01:10.22 (did not advance)

See also 
 Mongolia at the 2000 Summer Paralympics

References 
 Wallechinsky, David (2004). The Complete Book of the Summer Olympics (Athens 2004 Edition). Toronto, Canada. . 
 International Olympic Committee (2001). The Results. Retrieved 12 November 2005.
 Sydney Organising Committee for the Olympic Games (2001). Official Report of the XXVII Olympiad Volume 1: Preparing for the Games. Retrieved 20 November 2005.
 Sydney Organising Committee for the Olympic Games (2001). Official Report of the XXVII Olympiad Volume 2: Celebrating the Games. Retrieved 20 November 2005.
 Sydney Organising Committee for the Olympic Games (2001). The Results. Retrieved 20 November 2005.
 International Olympic Committee Web Site

Nations at the 2000 Summer Olympics
2000 Summer Olympics
2000 in Mongolian sport